The Kharkov Mathematical Society is an association of professional mathematicians in Kharkiv aimed at advancement of mathematical research and education, popularizing achievements of mathematics. The structure of the Society includes mathematicians of Verkin Institute for Low Temperature Physics and Engineering, V. N. Karazin Kharkiv National University and other higher educational institutions of Kharkov.

History and members of the Kharkov Mathematical Society 
Kharkov Mathematical Society was established in 1879 at Kharkov University by the initiative of 
Vasilii Imshenetskii, who also later founded the St. Petersburg Mathematical Society.
According to the statute of the society, "the aim of the Kharkov Mathematical Society was to support the development of mathematical science and education".

From 1885 to 1902 in Kharkov lived and worked an outstanding Russian mathematician, Aleksandr Lyapunov: during this period, Lyapunov's activities played an important role in the development of the Society. 
From 1902 to 1906, the Kharkov Mathematical Society was headed by Vladimir Steklov, the outstanding student of Aleksandr Lyapunov, 
who later organized and became the first director of the Institute of Physics and Mathematics of the Russian Academy of Sciences in Moscow.

Since 1906 and for the next almost forty years the Society was headed by a well-known geometer Dmitrii Sintsov.
Due to his initiatives, the activities of the Society significantly contributed to the improvement of mathematical education in Kharkov.

In 1933 Naum Akhiezer had moved to Kharkov and headed the Institute of Mathematics.
From 1947 Akhiezer became the head of KMS.
Thanks to his efforts, the mathematical community of Kharkiv has significantly strengthened.

Later, the Society was headed by Aleksei Pogorelov, Vladimir Marchenko, Iossif Ostrovskii. 
Currently, the president of the Society is Yeugen Kruslov.

At different times, members of society were
Konstantin Andreev, 
Naum Akhiezer,
Yeugen von Beyer,
Sergei Bernstein,
Yakov Blank,
Alexander Borisenko,
Valentina Borok,
Dmitry Grave,
Israel Glazman,
Vladimir Drinfeld,
Gershon Drinfeld,
Alexandre Eremenko,
Emmanuil Zhmud,
Vladimir Kadets,
Mikhail Kadets,
Mark Krein,
Lev Landau,
Naum Landkof,
Boris Levin,
Boris Levitan,
Mikhail Livsic,
Yury Lyubich,
Aleksandr Lyapunov,
Vladimir Marchenko,
Anatoly Myshkis,
Iossif Ostrovskii,
Leonid Pastur,
Alexander Povzner,
Aleksei Pogorelov,
Dmitrii Sintsov,
Vladimir Steklov,
Anton Sushkevich,
Gennady Feldman,
Yeugen Kruslov,
Igor Chueshov,
Dmitry Shepelsky,
Maria Scherbina.

In 1990 Vladimir Drinfeld was awarded by Fields Medal.

Publishing activities of the Society 

Almost immediately after the foundation, since 1880, the Society published the Communications of the Kharkov Mathematical Society
().
At first, there were two issues a year in size ranging from two to five printed sheets.
In 1960, the publications of the Communications of the Kharkov Mathematical Society were suspended.
Later, in 1965 due to the efforts of Naum Akhiezer the journal Theory of functions, functional analysis and applications was founded, which was published until 1992.
From 1994 to 1999 the Kharkov Mathematical Society participated in the publication of the journal Mathematical Physics, Analysis and Geometry.

Notes

Bibliography 

. This paper is an Italian translation by the author of an original commemorative paper in Russian, published in the 

 Akhiezer, N.I., Kharkov Mathematical Society, .
 .
 .
 Web-site of Kharkov Mathematical Society

Mathematical societies
1879 establishments in the Russian Empire
Organizations based in Kharkiv
Organizations established in 1879